Daniel Robinson (born 3 July 1994) is a former professional Australian rules footballer who played for the Sydney Swans in the Australian Football League (AFL).

Robinson was a NSW Scholarship selection at #51 in the 2013 rookie draft and was elevated to the senior list prior to the 2015 season. He made his senior debut against  in round 9. Robinson requested a trade away from Sydney during the 2017 trade period in search of more opportunity.

Robinson was delisted at the end of the 2018 season.

References

External links

1994 births
Living people
Sydney Swans players
NSW/ACT Rams players
Australian rules footballers from New South Wales
People educated at Xavier College
People educated at Saint Ignatius' College, Riverview